In enzymology, a steroid 17alpha-monooxygenase is an enzyme that catalyzes the chemical reaction

a steroid + AH2 + O2  a 17alpha-hydroxysteroid + A + H2O

The 3 substrates of this enzyme are steroid, an electron acceptor AH2, and O2, whereas its 3 products are 17alpha-hydroxysteroid, the reduction product A, and H2O.

This enzyme belongs to the family of oxidoreductases, specifically those acting on paired donors, with O2 as oxidant and incorporation or reduction of oxygen. The oxygen incorporated need not be derive from O miscellaneous.  The systematic name of this enzyme class is steroid,hydrogen-donor:oxygen oxidoreductase (17alpha-hydroxylating). Other names in common use include steroid 17alpha-hydroxylase, cytochrome P-45017alpha, cytochrome P-450 (P-45017alpha,lyase), and 17alpha-hydroxylase-C17,20 lyase.  This enzyme participates in c21-steroid hormone metabolism.  It has 3 cofactors: NADH, NADPH,  and Heme.

References

External links 
 

EC 1.14.99
NADH-dependent enzymes
NADPH-dependent enzymes
Heme enzymes
Enzymes of unknown structure